The 2014 Men's Oceania Handball Challenge Trophy was held at the ASB Sports Centre in Wellington, New Zealand between 8 and 13 December 2014.

The competition participants were defending champions Australia, host New Zealand, regulars Vanuatu and Cook Islands. New to the championship were America Samoa, Tahiti (French Polynesia), New Caledonia, Papua New Guinea and Samoa.

Tahiti were the winner upsetting Australia in the final and going through undefeated. Third was New Caledonia over host New Zealand. Fifth was Vanuatu, then Papua New Guinea, Samoa, America Samoa and Cook Islands.

Men's Results

Pool A

Pool B

5th to 9th place
Each team to play each other once. Round robin rounds and additional games to finalize positions.

Semi finals

Third place game

Final

Rankings

References

 2014 Introduction
 2014 Schedule
 2014 matches on YouTube
 Day 1 results
 Day 2 results
 Day 3 results
 Day 4 results
 Day 5 results
 Day 6 results
 AS Handball Association teams make history attending largest Oceania tournament. Samoa News. 6 Dec 2014.
 Official results - IHF

Oceania Handball Challenge Trophy
Oceania Handball Challenge Trophy
Oceania Handball Challenge Trophy
Oceania Handball Challenge Trophy
Oceania Handball Challenge Trophy
2014 in American Samoan sports
2014 in Cook Islands sport
2014 in French Polynesian sport
2014 in New Caledonian sport
2014 in Papua New Guinean sport
2014 in Samoan sport
Hand
December 2014 sports events in New Zealand